The Scottish actor Alastair Sim (1900–1976) performed in many media of light entertainment, including theatre, film and television. His career spanned from 1930 until his death. During that time he was a "memorable character player of faded Anglo-Scottish gentility, whimsically put-upon countenance, and sepulchral, sometimes minatory, laugh".

After studying chemistry at the University of Edinburgh, he was employed, between 1925 and 1930, as a lecturer in elocution at New College, Edinburgh, and also established his own school of drama and speech training. In 1930 he made his professional stage debut as a messenger in Othello at the Savoy Theatre, London—with Paul Robeson and Peggy Ashcroft in the lead roles. During the next five years he appeared on stage in New York and the UK, and spent two years at the Old Vic.

In 1935 he made his film debut, appearing in The Riverside Murder (dir. Albert Parker); he appeared in four films that year, and five the following. His film career progressed and by the mid 1940s he was a well-known figure in the theatre and cinema. The Times highlighted some of his more notable films, including Green for Danger (1946), The Happiest Days of Your Life (1950), Scrooge (1951), An Inspector Calls (1954), The Green Man (1956) and School for Scoundrels (1960). His Burke and Hare film The Anatomist debuted on British TV in 1956, and was later released theatrically in the U.S. in 1961.

Sim had been Rector of the University of Edinburgh in 1951, and was awarded CBE in 1953, although he turned down a knighthood that was offered to him by Edward Heath. His biographer, Bruce Babington, considered that "Sim was the paradigm – authority figure, yes, but often shadily duplicitous, often a manipulator of official rhetoric, his sexless bachelor persona containing strains of sexual ambiguity, his jolliness a latent vampirism." Sim died in August 1976.

Stage credits

Filmography

Television

Notes and references
Notes

References

Sources

External links
 Alastair Sim at the BFI
 
 
 

Male actor filmographies
British filmographies
Scottish filmographies